Pikalyovo or Pikalevo is the name of several inhabited localities in Russia.

Urban localities
Pikalyovo, Leningrad Oblast, a town in Pikalyovskoye Settlement Municipal Formation of Boksitogorsky District, Leningrad Oblast

Rural localities
Pikalevo, Vladimir Oblast, a village in Alexandrovsky District of Vladimir Oblast